Ernesto Cristaldo (born 16 March 1984) is a Paraguayan footballer.

Club career 
Cristaldo began his playing career in 2004 with Cerro Porteño, between 2008 and 2009 he played for Newell's Old Boys of Argentina before returning to Cerro Porteño. On 6 January 2011, he moved to Sol de América, before he moved to Colombian side Cúcuta Deportivo in August 2011. Cristaldo moved to Bolivian ex-champions The Strongest in January 2012.

International career 
Cristaldo played for Paraguay at the 2003 FIFA World Youth Championship and the 2004 Olympics, where he won a silver medal. On 4 August, before the Summer Olympics began, he played in a preparation game against the Portugal of Cristiano Ronaldo in the city of Algarve, resulting in a 5–0 defeat.

References

External links
 Argentine Primera statistics at Fútbol XXI  
 
 Ernesto Cristaldo video
 

1984 births
Living people
Paraguayan footballers
Paraguayan expatriate footballers
Paraguay international footballers
Paraguay under-20 international footballers
Olympic footballers of Paraguay
Footballers at the 2004 Summer Olympics
Olympic silver medalists for Paraguay
2004 Copa América players
Sportspeople from Asunción
Olympic medalists in football
Medalists at the 2004 Summer Olympics
Association football midfielders
Cerro Porteño players
Cúcuta Deportivo footballers
Newell's Old Boys footballers
The Strongest players
Club Sol de América footballers
Club Nacional footballers
Deportivo Capiatá players
Argentine Primera División players
Paraguayan Primera División players
Bolivian Primera División players
Categoría Primera A players
Paraguayan expatriate sportspeople in Argentina
Paraguayan expatriate sportspeople in Colombia
Paraguayan expatriate sportspeople in Bolivia
Expatriate footballers in Argentina
Expatriate footballers in Colombia
Expatriate footballers in Bolivia